Riti Huasi (possibly from Quechua rit'i snow, wasi house "snow house") is a mountain in the Vilcanota mountain range in the Andes of Peru, about  high. It is situated in the Puno Region, Carabaya Province, on the border of the districts Corani and Ollachea.

See also 
 Ananta
 Macho Ritti

References

Mountains of Peru
Mountains of Puno Region